Dhaneta railway station (station code: DAN) is a railway station on the Lucknow–Moradabad line located in village Dhaneta of Bareilly district in Uttar Pradesh, India. It is under the administrative control of the Moradabad Division of the Northern Railway zone of the Indian Railways.

Two Passenger trains stop at the station.

References

Moradabad railway division
Railway stations in Bareilly district